Many have incorporated a god of death into their mythology or religion. As death, along with birth, is among the major parts of human life, these deities may often be one of the most important deities of a religion. In some religions in which a single powerful deity is the object of worship, the death deity is an antagonist against whom the primary deity struggles. The related term death worship has most often been used as a derogatory term to accuse certain groups of morally abhorrent practices which set no value on human life. In monotheistic religions, death is commonly personified by an angel or demon instead of a deity.

Occurrence
In polytheistic religions which have a complex system of deities governing various natural phenomena and aspects of human life, it is common to have a deity who is assigned the function of presiding over death. This deity may actually take the life of humans or, more commonly, simply rule over the afterlife in that particular belief system (a single religion may have separate deities performing both tasks). The deity in question may be good, evil, or neutral and simply doing their job, in sharp contrast to a lot of modern portrayals of death deities as all being inherently evil just because death is feared. Hades from Greek mythology is an especially common target. The inclusion of such a "departmental" deity of death in a religion's pantheon is not necessarily the same thing as the glorification of death.

A death deity has a good chance of being either male or female, unlike some functions that seem to steer towards one gender in particular, such as fertility and earth deities being female and storm deities being male. A single religion/mythology may have death gods of more than one gender existing at the same time and they may be envisioned as a married couple ruling over the afterlife together, as with the Aztecs, Greeks, and Romans.

In monotheistic religions, the one god governs both life and death (as well as everything else). However, in practice this manifests in different rituals and traditions and varies according to a number of factors including geography, politics, traditions, and the influence of other religions.

Africa and the Middle East

Sub-Sahara Africa

Igbo 
Ala (Igbo mythology)
Ogbunabali (Igbo mythology)

Yoruba 
Eshu (Yoruba religion)
Iku (god) (Yoruba religion)

Akan 

 Owuo, Akan God of Death and Destruction. Name literally means death in the Akan language
 Asase Yaa, one half of an Akan Goddess of the barren places on Earth, Truth and is Mother of the Dead 
 Amokye, Psychopomp in Akan religion who fishes the souls of the dead from the river leading to Asamando, the Akan underworld

Afroasiatic Africa

Somali 

 Huur, a messenger of Death who had the form of a large bird similar to Horus of ancient Egypt.

Afroasiatic Middle East

Canaanite  
Mot

Egyptian  
Aker (Egyptian mythology)
Andjety, an old Egyptian god
Anubis, guardian of the dead, mummification, and the afterlife in ancient Egyptian religion
Aqen, a rarely mentioned deity in the Book of the Dead
Assessors of Maat, charged with judging the souls of the dead in the afterlife
Duamutef, one of the four sons of Horus
Hapi, one of the four sons of Horus
Imset, one of the four sons of Horus
Kherty Egyptian earth god
Medjed, an unusual looking god mentioned in the Book of the Dead
Nephthys(NebetHuet), Anubis' mother; sister of Osiris and Isis (Aset); also a guardian of the dead. She was believed to also escort dead souls to Osiris
Nehebkau, the primordial snake and funerary god associated with the afterlife, and one of the forty-two assessors of Maat
Osiris, lord of the Underworld
Qebehsenuef, one of the four sons of Horus
Seker, a falcon god of the Memphite necropolis who was known as a patron of the living, as well as a god of the dead. He is known to be closely tied to Osiris
Serapis, Graeco-Egyptian syncretistic deity, combining elements of Osiris, the Apis Bull, Hades, Demeter, and Dionysus. Also, patron of the Ptolemaic Kingdom and Alexandria
Wepwawet, a wolf god of war, and brother of Anubis, being seen as one who opened the ways to, and through, Duat, for the spirits of the dead

Mesopotamian  
Ereshkigal (Sumerian mythology, Akkadian mythology, Babylonian mythology), first lady of the Underworld
Namtar (Sumerian mythology, Akkadian mythology, Babylonian mythology), Ereshkigal's sukkal.
Nergal (Sumerian mythology, Akkadian mythology, Babylonian mythology), second lord of the Underworld
Inshushinak (Elamite mythology; also present in the Mesopotamian An-Anum god list.)
Nungal (Babylonian mythology), daughter of Ereshkigal
Erra (god)
Ugur (Hurrian religion; also a sukkal of Nergal)
Ninazu
Ningishzida
Allani 
Enmesharra, a primordial deity described as "lord of the underworld" 
Kanisurra, a goddess whose name is derived from the term "ganzer," referring to the underworld (Mesopotamian)
Shuwala, a goddess of Hurrian origin worshiped in Ur
Lagamal, minor underworld deity
Birtum, husband of Manungal

Western Eurasia

European

Albanian 
Djall, symbolizes the devil. (Djaj(plural))
Mortja, personification of death. An equivalent of Grim Reaper.(Female)(Mortjet, plural)
Vdekja, personification of death. (Female)

Balto-Finnic 
Tuoni (Finnish mythology, Estonian mythology)

Balto-Slavic  
Giltinė (Lithuanian mythology)
Māra (Latvian mythology)
Morana (Slavic mythology)
Peckols (Prussian mythology)
Peklenc
Veles
Chernobog (Slavic mythology)

Basque 
Erio (Basque mythology)

Celtic  
Ankou (Breton people)
Arawn
Cichol
Crom Cruach
Donn
Mannanan
The Morrigan
Scáthach Goddess of the dead

Norse-Germanic  

Freyja, presides over Fólkvangr; chooses half of those who die in battle
Gefjon, a goddess who oversees those who die as virgins
Hel, goddess of the dead and queen of Helheim, where people who didn't die in battle or drown go after death
Odin presides over Valhalla and gets half of those who die in battle; there they train for Ragnarok
Rán, the sea goddess who collects the drowned in her net

Etruscan  
Aita, god of the underworld
Culga, a female underworld spirit
Februus, god of purification, death, the underworld, and riches
Mani, spirits of the dead
Mania, goddess of the dead
Mantus, god of the underworld
Orcus, god of the underworld
Tuchulcha, an underworld spirit
Vanth, winged spirit of the underworld

Greek  
 
 Achlys, goddess who symbolizes the mist of death. Goddess of poisons, personification of misery and sadness. 
 Apollo, god of diseases
 Atropos, one of the moirai, who cut the thread of life. 
Charon, a daimon who acted as ferryman of the dead.
Erebus, the primordial god of darkness, his mists encircled the underworld and filled the hollows of the earth
Erinyes, chthonic deities of vengeance
Hades, king of the underworld
Hecate, goddess of witchcraft, she helped Demeter in the search for Persephone and was allowed to live in the Underworld as her magic works best at night
Hermes, the messenger god who acted as psychopompos 
Hypnos, personification of sleep, twin of Thanatos, his Roman counterpart is Somnus
Keres, goddesses of violent death, sisters of Thanatos
Lampades, torch-bearing underworld nymphs
Limos was the goddess of starvation in ancient Greek religion. She was opposed by Demeter, goddess of grain and the harvest with whom Ovid wrote Limos could never meet, and Plutus, the god of wealth and the bounty of rich harvests.[1]
Macaria, goddess of the blessed death (not to be confused with the daughter of Heracles)
Persephone, queen of the underworld; wife of Hades and goddess of spring growth
Serapis, Graeco-Egyptian syncretistic deity, combining elements of Osiris, the Apis Bull, Hades, Demeter, and Dionysus. Also, patron of the Ptolemaic Kingdom and Alexandria.
Tartarus, the darkest, deepest part of the underworld, often used for imprisoning enemies of the Olympians
Thanatos, personification of death, Roman counterpart is Mors
 Gods of the seven rivers of the underworld:
 Acheron, god of the river Acheron
 Alpheus, god of the river Alpheus
 Cocytus, god of the river Cocytus
 Eridanos, god of the river Eridanos
 Lethe, goddess of the river Lethe
 Phlegethon, god of the river Phlegethon 
 Styx, goddess of the river Styx, a river that formed a boundary between the living and the dead

Roman  
Dea Tacita, goddess of the dead
Di inferi, ancient Roman deities associated with death and the Underworld
Dis Pater, god of the underworld 
Laverna, goddess of thieves, cheats, and the underworld 
Lemures, the malevolent dead
Libitina, goddess of funerals and burials
Manes, spirits of the dead
Mania, goddess of death
Mors, personification of death, Greek equivalent is Thanatos
Nenia Dea, goddess of funerals
Orcus, punisher of broken oaths; usually folded in with Pluto
Pluto, ruler of the Underworld
Proserpina, queen of the underworld
Soranus, underworld Sabine god adopted by the Romans
Viduus, god who separated the soul and body after death

Western Asia

Elamite 
Inshushinak

Hindu-Vedic 
Chitragupta, god of justice after death
Mara
Yama, god of death and ruler of the afterlife
Dhumavati, goddess of death, misfortune and temporality
Shiva, god of destruction, time, and the arts

Persian-Zoroastrian 
Angra Mainyu or Ahriman, the destructive spirit (Persian mythology)
Asto Vidatu or Astiwihad or Asto-widhatu, death deity (Persian mythology)

Ossetian 
Aminon, gatekeeper of the underworld.
Barastyr, ruler of the underworld.
Ishtar-Deela, lord of the underworld in Nakh.

Uralic 
Azyren (Mari people)
Kalma, Finnish goddess of death and decay, her name meaning "the stench of corpses"
Nga (Nenets)
Tuoni (Finnish mythology), with his wife and children.

Asia-Pacific / Oceania

Far East Asia 
Korean 

 Yeom-ra, or Great King Yeom-ra' (King Yama)

Chinese 
Emperor(s) of Youdu (Capital City of the Underworld)
 Di Guan Da Di
 Dong Yue Da Di
 Feng Du Da Di
 Yanluo Wang (King Yama)
 Meng Po

Judges of the Ten Underworld Courts
 Jiang Ziwen
 Bao Zheng
 Dong Ji
 Huang Xile

The rest only have surnames including Li, Yu, Lu, Bi, Lu and Xue.

Four Kings of the Underworld
 Bao Zheng
 Han Qinhu
 Fan Zhongyan
 Kou Zhun

Ghost Kings of the Five Regions
 Cai Yulei
 Zhao He
 Zhang Heng
 Duzi Ren
 Zhou Qi

Ghost Kings of the Five Regions (Ver.2)
 Shen Cha
 Yang Yun
 Yan Di (Shenlong)
 Ji Kang
 Immortal Wang

Governors of Fengdu
 Deng Ai
 Ji Ming

Imperial Censor of Fengdu
 Han Yi
 Zeng Yuanshan
 Jiao Zhongqing
 Ma Zhong
 Song Youqing
 Guan Yu (note: different from the famous general of three kingdoms)
 Wu Lun
 Tu Cha

Four Generals of the Direct Altar of Fengdu
 Ma Sheng
 Ma Chuanzhong
 Chen Yuanbo
 Guo Zhongyou

Eight Generals of the Inner Altar of Fengdu
 Wei Tin, Ghost Capturing General
 Liu Chu, Ghost Restraining General
 Wang Jian, Ghost Flailing General
 Meng E, Ghost Interrogating General
 Che Zi, Guardian of the East Gate
 Xia Dali, Guardian of the West Gate 
 Lie Weizhi, Guardian of the South Gate
 Sang Tongguai, Guardian of the North Gate

Eight Generals of the Outer Altar of Fengdu
 Zhang Yuanlian
 Chen Yuanqing
 Li Yuande
 Fan YuanZhang
 Du YuanZhen
 Liu Yuanfu
 Chang Yuan
 Jia Taoyuan

Ten Masters of the Underworld
 A Bang, Bull Head
 Luo Cha, Horse Face
 Xie Bi'an, Wondering God of the Day
 Fan Wujiu, Wondering God of the Night
 Hei Wuchang (Black Impermanence)
 Bai Wuchang (White Impermanence)
 Huangfeng (responsible for insects)
 Paowei (responsible for animals)
 Yusai (responsible for fishes)
 Guaiwang (responsible for Hungry Ghosts) 
(Note: in some versions, Xie Bi'an and Fanjiu are the Bai Wuchang and Hei Wuchang, respectively.)

Four Strongmen of Fengdu
 Zhang Yuanzhen, Taiyi Strongman
 Hu Wenzhong, Tri-day Strongman
 Sun Zhongwu, Demon-smiting Strongman
 Tang Bocheng, Ghost-smiting Strongman

Two Agents of Fengdu
 Xun Gongda, Great God of the Black Sky
 Liu Guangzhong, Great God of the Black Fog

Wardens of the Nine Prison of Fengdu
 Wang Yuanzhen
 Zhen Yan
 Yao Quan
 Shi Tong
 Zhou Sheng
 Diao Xiao
 Kong Sheng
 Wu Yan
 Wang Tong

Administers of the Six Paths of Rebirth of Fengdu 
 Cao Qing, Administer of the Path of Heaven
 Tien Yan, Administer of the Path of Ghosts
 Cui Cong, Administer of the Path of Earth
 Ji Bie, Administer of the Path of Gods
 Chen De, Administer of the Path of Hungry Ghosts
 Gao Ren, Administer of the Path of Beasts

Judges of Fengdu
 Cui (Chief Judge)
 Wang Fu
 Ban Jian
 Zi He
 Jia Yuan
 Zhao Sheng
 Zhang Qi
 Yang Tong
 Fu Po
 Zhu Shun
 Li Gong
 Xue Zhong
 Rong Zhen
 Lu Zhongce
 Chen Xun
 Huang Shou
 Zhou Bi
 Bian Shen
 Cheng De
 Liu Bao
 Dong Jie
 Guo Yuan

Japanese  
Izanami, when she died she became queen of the underworld, Yomi, and goddess of the dead.
Enma, god and ruler of the dead in Japanese Buddhism
Shinigami, god of death.

North and Central Asian mythology
Erlik (Turkic mythology)
Xargi (Siberian mythology)

Oceanian mythology
Wuluwaid (Australian Aboriginal mythology)
Degei (Fijian mythology)
Hine-nui-te-pō (Maori mythology)
Whiro (Maori mythology)

Southeast Asian mythology

Batara Kala (Balinese mythology), god of the underworld in traditional Javanese and Balinese mythology, ruling over it in a cave along with Setesuyara. Batara Kala is also named the creator of light and the earth. He is also the god of time and destruction, who devours unlucky people. He is related to Hindu concept of Kala, or time. In mythology, he causes eclipses by trying to eat the Sun or the Moon.
Shingon (nat) (Burmese)
 Thongalel (Manipuri mythology) 
Pong Lalondong (Toraja), god of death

Philippines

Tagbayan (Ifugao mythology): divinities associated with death that feast on human souls that are guarded by two headed monsters called kikilan
Fulor (Ifugao mythology): a wood carved into an image of a dead person seated on a death chair; an antique which a spirit in it, who bring sickness, death, and unsuccessful crops when sacrifices are not offered
Kabunyan (Kalanguya mythology): the almighty creator; also referred to as Agmattebew, the spirit who could not be seen; the mabaki ritual is held in the deity's honor during planting, harvesting, birth and death of the people, and other activities for livelihood
Binangewan (Aeta mythology): spirits who bring change, sickness, and death as punishment
Aring Sinukûan (Kapampangan mythology): sun god of war and death, taught the early inhabitants the industry of metallurgy, wood cutting, rice culture and even waging war
Lakandánup (Kapampangan mythology): serpent goddess who comes during total eclipses; followed by famine; eats a person's shadow, which will result in withering and death; daughter of Áring Sínukuan and Dápu
Sidapa (Bisaya mythology): the goddess of death; co-ruler of the middleworld called Kamaritaan, together with Makaptan
Sidapa (Hiligaynon mythology): god who lives in the sacred Mount Madia-as; determines the day of a person's death by marking every newborn's lifespan on a very tall tree on Madya-as
Hangin (Hiligaynon mythology): the spirits of the death wind; takes the life of the elderly
Patag'aes (Suludnon mythology): awaits until midnight then enters the house to have a conversation with the living infant; if he discovers someone is eavesdropping, he will choke the child to death; their conversation creates the fate of the child, on how long the child wants to live and how the child will eventually die, where the child will always get to choose the answers; once done, Patag'aes takes out his measuring stick, computes the child's life span, and then departs, sealing the child's fate
Pamulak Manobo (Bagobo mythology): supreme deity who controls good harvest, rain, wind, life, and death; in some myths, the chief deity is simply referred as the male deity, Diwata
Malakal Maut (Maranao mythology): the angel of death; takes the souls of someone after three to seven days from the falling of the person's leaf from the sacred Sadiarathul Montaha tree in the realm called Sorga; appears either a handsome prince or a grotesque monsters, depending if the soul he is getting comes from a sinner or a virtuous person; punishes the souls of sinners until final judgment, while lifting up the souls of the good onto heaven
Kumakatok - hooded and cloaked harbingers of death that would knock on doors of the dying in Tagalog mythology
Magwayen - the goddess of afterlife and the first ocean deity, according to Visayan mythology. Known for being the goddess who collects souls and takes them to Sulad with her boat. The souls are initially transferred to her via Pandaki, who gets the soul from Sidapa.
Sitan - god and caretaker of the underworld realm for evil souls known as Kasamaan in Tagalog mythology. Maca, the realm of the good dead, is jointly ruled by Sitan and Bathala.
Manduyapit - bring souls across a red river in Manobo mythology
Mama Guayen - ferries souls to the end of the world in Ilonggo mythology
Badadum - deity in Waray mythology that gathers family members at the mouth of a river to make a farewell to the deceased

Vietnam
 Diêm Vương (King Yama)
 Mạnh Bà
 Hắc Bạch Vô Thường, two spirits capture souls.
 Đầu Trâu
 Mặt Ngựa

American mythology

Aztec
Cihuateteo (Aztec mythology), Divine women. Spirits of women who died during labor. 
Coatlicue (Aztec mythology), minor goddess of death, as well as the goddess of life and rebirth
Itztlacoliuhqui (Aztec mythology), personification of winter-as-death
Mictecacihuatl (Aztec mythology), the chief death goddess; Queen of Mictlan (underworld) or Lady of the Dead
Mictlantecuhtli (Aztec mythology), the chief death god; lord of the Underworld
Tlaloc (Aztec mythology), water god and minor death god; ruler of Tlalocan, a separate underworld for those who died from drowning
Xipe Totec (Aztec mythology), hero god, death god; inventor of warfare and master of plagues
Xolotl (Aztec mythology), god of sunset, fire, lightning, and death

Cahuilla
Muut

Guarani
Luison, Guarani mythology

Haida
Ta'xet, Haida mythology
Tia (goddess)

Inca
Supay (Inca mythology)
Vichama (Inca mythology)

Inuit
Aipaloovik
Pana

Latin American Folk Catholicism
El Tío, lord of the underworld, in Cerro Rico, Bolivia
Santa Muerte, folk saint and goddess of death in Mexico
San La Muerte, folk saint and god of death in Paraguay, Argentina, and Brazil
San Pascualito, folk saint and god of death in Guatemala and Mexico

Maya
Camazotz, bat god who resides in the underworld
Cizin
Ixtab
Xtabay
Maya death gods known under various names (Hunhau, Uacmitun Ahau, Ah Puch, Kisin, Yum Kimil)

Narragansett
Chepi

Taíno
Maquetauire Guayaba
Opiel Guabiron

Umbanda and Candomblé
Exu caveira
Exu Tranca-rua das almas

Haitian Vodou
Gede lwa
Baron Samedi, Baron La Croix, Baron Cimetiere, Baron Kriminel
Ghede Nibo
Maman Brigitte

In fiction
Death is the protagonist in the science fantasy novel On a Pale Horse, book one in a series of 8 books, the "Incarnations of Immortality".

In the novel The Book Thief, Death is the narrator of the story.

Death is the name of one of "The Endless" in the DC Universe.

Death is a recurring character in the Discworld series written by Terry Pratchett. Books featuring Death include Mort, Reaper Man, Soul Music, Hogfather and Thief of Time. He also makes a cameo appearance in Interesting Times.

In A Song of Ice and Fire by George R.R. Martin, the guild of assassins known as the Faceless Men believe that all death deities are simply different incarnations of the same god, known to them as the Many-Faced God or Him of Many Faces, while the Faith of the Seven worships The Stranger as one of Seven Aspects of God representing Death and the Unknown.

In the works of J. R. R. Tolkien, especially The Silmarillion, Námo a.k.a. Lord Mandos is the Doomsman of the Valar, Judge of the Dead and Lord of the Halls of Mandos (where Elves await reincarnation and humans retreat before making the Journey into the Beyond).

In the CW TV show Supernatural, Death makes a crucial appearance. He is portrayed as existing alongside God since the beginning of time and being so ancient he cannot remember when he came into existence; he may even be older than God. In the show he is the oldest and most powerful of the Four Horsemen (Death, Famine, War and Pestilence). He is not portrayed as a villain.

In the Sailor Moon franchise, the last Sailor Guardian (of the Sol System) introduced is Sailor Saturn. Her powers revolve around destruction, ruin, and death and she can be thought of as a "god" of sorts (all Sailor Guardians can). Her weapon is the Silence Glaive that is capable of utterly obliterating and destroying entire worlds/planets if used to its maximum potential.

In the Marvel Comics Universe, the personification of death is Mistress Death.

The Transformers mythos features the character of Mortilus, a Cybertronian deity who represents death and who later betrayed his brethren and was destroyed, leading to the longevity of the Transformer race. A similar character is The Fallen, a member of the Thirteen Primes who is identified as the guardian of entropy.

In the manga and anime, Death Note, gods of death (shinigami) exist in their own realm and are owners of Death Notes, which are used to kill humans. When a note falls into the human world, the person who touches it first becomes the new owner of the note, can recognize the god of death to whom it belongs, and the god follows them for the rest of their life. However, shinigami are more like Grim Reapers with freakish appearances than deities who are worshiped. This is because shinigami are a fairly recent concept in Japanese folklore directly inspired by the European figure of the Grim Reaper, and thus, aren't "true" death gods. Despite their Western origin, many people will refer to both the Death Note characters and the folklorical shinigami using the Japanese name instead of the English translation or even "Grim Reaper". For similar cases of shinigami being more akin to Grim Reapers in anime, see Bleach (anime) and Soul Eater (anime).

In the 2018 Nintendo published title Kirby Star Allies a Butterfly is revealed to be the embodiment of death, ruling the underworld after atomizing and absorbing Galacta Knight to become Morpho Knight. Very little is known about it but it is awaiting something called the Day of Judgement.

In Nintendo's Metroid franchise one of the bosses, Ridley, is also known as "the Cunning God of Death".

In the series Malazan Book of the Fallen, Hood is the God of Death, and King of High House Death.

In the Warhammer fantasy battle universe of Games Workshop, Morr is the god of death.

See also
 Afterlife
 Death (personification)
 Liminal deity
 List of deities
 List of night deities
 List of fictional demons
 List of theological demons
 List of ghosts
 Psychopomp
 Time and fate deities
Sailor Saturn
Veneration of the dead

References

 
Comparative mythology
Lists of deities